Eugene is an unincorporated community in Eugene Township, Vermillion County, in the U.S. state of Indiana.

History
The town was laid out in 1827.   Legend says that a local drunk, while searching for his wife, would frequently call out "Oh, Jane", but his inebriation caused it to sound more like "Eu, Jene", and this was taken as the name for the town.  The actual source of the name is not known. A post office was established at Eugene in 1826, and remained in operation until 1954.

The town is the subject of several poems in Lantern Gleams from Old Eugene, a collection of poetry by Eugene native Alice Craig Fuller.

Geography
Eugene is located at  (39.965310, -87.472680), just north of the larger town of Cayuga.  The Vermilion River flows around the north and east sides of town before meeting the Wabash River less than two miles east.

References

Unincorporated communities in Vermillion County, Indiana
Unincorporated communities in Indiana
Terre Haute metropolitan area